The list of lakes, lochs, loughs and llyns of the United Kingdom is a link page for some large lakes of the United Kingdom (England, Scotland, Wales and Northern Ireland), including lochs fully enclosed by land.

Lakes in Scotland are called lochs, and in Northern Ireland loughs (pronounced the same way, i.e. (/lɒç/)). In Wales a lake is called a llyn. The words "loch" and "lough", in addition to referring to bodies of freshwater ("lakes"), are also applied to bodies of brackish water or seawater, which in other countries or contexts may be called fjord, firth, estuary, bay etc.  In particular, the term "sea-loch" is used in Scotland in this way, as the English language equivalent of 'fjord'. (There are many examples, including Loch Carron, Loch Torridon etc.) 

Some of the largest lakes in England and Wales are man-made reservoirs or lakes whose size has been increased by damming.

Largest water bodies in the United Kingdom

This table includes the ten largest fresh water bodies by area. Lough Neagh is the largest water body in the UK by this measure, although Loch Ness is the largest by volume and contains nearly double the amount of water in all the lakes of England and Wales combined. Loch Morar is the deepest of the UK's lakes and Loch Awe the longest. Murray and Pullar (1910) note that the mean depth of Loch Ness is 57.4% of the maximum depth – higher than in any other large deep loch in Scotland. The deepest lake in England is Wast Water which descends to 76 metres (249 ft).

Largest natural lakes in England

Largest natural lakes in Wales 
These are largely 'natural' but some have minor modifications to regulate their outflow.

Largest reservoirs in the United Kingdom

See also 

List of lakes in England
List of loughs in Ireland
List of lochs in Scotland
List of lakes in Wales
List of lakes in the Lake District
Geography of the United Kingdom

Notes

References 

 Murray, Sir John and Pullar, Laurence (1910) Bathymetrical Survey of the Fresh-Water Lochs of Scotland, 1897-1909. London; Challenger Office.

 Lakes